D47 may refer to :Artist
 D47  Singer
 D47 Rapper, Songwriter
 ,
 , a Battle-class destroyer of the Royal Navy
 

 comed